John Okul is a Papua New Guinean rugby league footballer who represented Papua New Guinea at the 1995 World Cup.

Playing career
Okul played for the Lae club in Papua New Guinea and represented the Highlands Zone in 1991 against Australia. He was first selected for Papua New Guinea in 1994 and played in another three test matches, including two at the 1995 World Cup.

Following the tournament he was signed by Hull Kingston Rovers, along with teammate Stanley Gene. He played for PNG at the 1997 Super League World Nines. After his Hull KR career was hampered by injury, Okul had stints with the Doncaster Dragons, and the Barrow Border Raiders. In 2002 and 2003 he played for West Hull in the BARLA National Conference League’s Premier Division.

References

Living people
Barrow Raiders players
Doncaster R.L.F.C. players
Expatriate rugby league players in England
Hull Kingston Rovers players
Lae Bombers players
Papua New Guinea national rugby league team players
Papua New Guinean expatriate rugby league players
Papua New Guinean expatriate sportspeople in the United Kingdom
Papua New Guinean rugby league players
Papua New Guinean sportsmen
Place of birth missing (living people)
Rugby league centres
Rugby league fullbacks
Rugby league wingers
Year of birth missing (living people)